Eldar Djangirov (born January 28, 1987), also known as Eldar, is an American jazz pianist. He was born in Tokmok, Kyrgyz SSR, Soviet Union to Tanya and Emil Djangirov, and is of Volga Tatar and Russian descent. He grew up in Kansas City, MO from the age of 10 and also lived in San Diego, California during his teenage years. As of 2016, he resides in New York City.

Career
Eldar began playing the piano when he was three years old. The first piece he remembers learning was "C Jam Blues". He later took classical lessons and was "discovered" at age 9 by the late New York City jazz aficionado Charles McWhorter, who saw him play at a festival in Siberia. The family relocated to Kansas City, drawn there in large part by the city's jazz history. During his Kansas City years, even before reaching his teens, Eldar already started building a reputation as a child prodigy, appearing on Marian McPartland's NPR show, Piano Jazz, when he was only 12 years old, being the youngest performer to appear on her show. Eldar attended Interlochen Center for the Arts in his young teenage years. Eldar attended St. Elizabeth's grade school and the Barstow School in Kansas City. Eventually, the family moved to San Diego where he attended the Francis W. Parker School (San Diego), and then to the Los Angeles area where he attended University of Southern California's Thornton School of Music. Eldar's playing style is characterized by prodigious technique and musicality. Downbeat noted in a review by Bob Doerschuk: "his command of the instrument is beyond staggering."  He was signed to Sony Music at 18 and released 5 albums.  One of the albums was nominated for a Grammy.  Eldar has extensively toured throughout Europe, Asia and North America.

Eldar has been variously compared to Art Tatum, Oscar Peterson, Herbie Hancock and more; yet he also seems to absorb harmonic expansiveness from McCoy Tyner and at times the lyrical sensitivity from Bill Evans. Eldar performed at Grammy Awards telecast and was honored the first time in many years as a jazz artist. Eldar has also been seen on Conan O'Brien, CBS Saturday Early Show, Jimmy Kimmel Live and CBS Sunday Morning.

Discography

As leader

As sideman

References

External links 
 
 JazzPolice.com Review: Eldar Live at the Blue Note
 Three Stories album review
 All About Jazz "Three Stories" review
 "Virtue" review
 Eldar San Diego Symphony Concert

1987 births
Living people
American jazz pianists
American male pianists
American people of Tatar descent
Kyrgyzstani emigrants to the United States
Kyrgyzstani people of Russian descent
Kyrgyzstani people of Tatar descent
People from Chüy Region
Musicians from Kansas City, Missouri
Musicians from San Diego
USC Thornton School of Music alumni
Jazz musicians from California
Jazz musicians from Missouri
21st-century American pianists
21st-century American male musicians
American male jazz musicians
Motéma Music artists
Sony Classical Records artists